Mocis persinuosa is a species of moth of the family Erebidae. It is found in the Democratic Republic of Congo (Katanga) and Zambia.

References

Moths described in 1910
Mocis